Wellington Central is an inner-city suburb of Wellington, and the financial heart of the both the city and the Wellington Region. It comprises the northern part of the central business district, with the majority of Wellington's high-rise buildings.

Landmarks
The majority of Wellington's High Street, Lambton Quay, runs through Wellington Central. From Lambton Quay the Wellington Cable Car is accessible.

Wellington Central is also home to Wellington's Civic Precinct, including Civic Square, the Wellington Town Hall, Wellington Central Library, the Michael Fowler Centre, and City Gallery Wellington. It is one of the few locations in New Zealand that is home to a number of high rise buildings, including the Majestic Centre, and Aon Centre (Wellington).

Geography
Wellington Central consists of the flat, mostly reclaimed land, west of Lambton Harbour and the part of The Terrace immediately above it. It is bounded on the north by the suburb Pipitea (which includes Parliament Buildings) and extends as far south as Civic Square. The part of Wellington Central Business District south of Wellington Central is called Te Aro, which is the focus of Wellington's night-life.

Demographics

Wellington Central had a population of 3,000 at the 2018 New Zealand census, an increase of 114 people (4.0%) since the 2013 census, and an increase of 1,008 people (50.6%) since the 2006 census. There were 1,269 households. There were 1,437 males and 1,566 females, giving a sex ratio of 0.92 males per female. The median age was 26 years (compared with 37.4 years nationally), with 69 people (2.3%) aged under 15 years, 1,770 (59.0%) aged 15 to 29, 951 (31.7%) aged 30 to 64, and 210 (7.0%) aged 65 or older.

Ethnicities were 70.1% European/Pākehā, 6.7% Māori, 2.6% Pacific peoples, 26.4% Asian, and 3.4% other ethnicities (totals add to more than 100% since people could identify with multiple ethnicities).

The proportion of people born overseas was 41.4%, compared with 27.1% nationally.

Although some people objected to giving their religion, 57.8% had no religion, 22.8% were Christian, 5.7% were Hindu, 3.0% were Muslim, 2.4% were Buddhist and 4.0% had other religions.

Of those at least 15 years old, 1,290 (44.0%) people had a bachelor or higher degree, and 42 (1.4%) people had no formal qualifications. The median income was $25,300, compared with $31,800 nationally. The employment status of those at least 15 was that 1,356 (46.3%) people were employed full-time, 426 (14.5%) were part-time, and 207 (7.1%) were unemployed.

References

Suburbs of Wellington City
Central business districts in New Zealand
Economy of Wellington
Populated places around the Wellington Harbour